André Duberry (born August 24, 1982) is a Canadian soccer player who currently plays for FC Edmonton in the North American Soccer League.

Career

Youth and college
Born in Calgary, Alberta, Duberry played four years of college soccer at the Mount Royal College, winning a national championship in 2004 and being named an All-Canadian in 2006.

Professional
After playing with Canadian amateur side Calgary Callies, with whom he won National Championships in 2007 and 2008, and participating in trials with Scottish clubs Livingston and Peterhead in 2008, Duberry played with FC Edmonton throughout their exhibition season in 2010. He signed a formal professional contract in March 2011 prior to FC Edmonton's debut season in the new North American Soccer League, and made his professional debut on April 20, 2011, in 2-0 loss to the Carolina RailHawks. The club re-signed Duberry for the 2012 season on October 12, 2011.

References

External links
 FC Edmonton bio
 Sports Academy profile

1982 births
Living people
Canadian soccer players
FC Edmonton players
North American Soccer League players
Soccer players from Calgary
Association football defenders